Eupithecia marmaricata is a moth in the family Geometridae. It is found in Libya.

References

Moths described in 1922
marmaricata
Moths of Africa